NGC 268 is a spiral galaxy located in the constellation Cetus. It was discovered on November 22, 1785 by William Herschel.

References

External links
 

0268
Cetus (constellation)
Barred spiral galaxies
002927